Icarus is a football kit and apparel brand based out of Philadelphia, United States. Icarus was created to provide clubs with original and creative jerseys that represent their identity. Since its inception in 2017, Icarus has partnered with over 600 clubs from around the world, including those that play in national leagues like NISA, UPSL, NPSL and USL League 2.

In 2020, Icarus moved into a new warehouse in Philadelphia and established a Regional Office in London to work with clubs in the UK and Europe.

Partnerships

Icarus is the official kit and apparel supplier of numerous association football teams, players and associations, including:

Associations 

  USWNTPA

Club teams 

North America

  AFC Columbia
  Atlantic City FC
  Fall River Marksmen
  FC Motown
  Fort Wayne FC
  Louisiana Krewe FC
  Maryland Bobcats FC
  New Amsterdam FC
  Palm Beach Breakers 
  Philadelphia Lone Star
  Providence City FC

Europe

  Elidi FC (3. Deild Karla)
  Ormeau Road Celtic FC
  Portobello FC

Africa

A*  Accra Great Olympics
  Bibiani Gold Stars F.C.
  Ebusua Dwarfs
  Samartex
  Sekondi Hasaacas FC
  Miscellaneous SC Serowe

References

External links
 Official website

Companies established in 2017
Sporting goods manufacturers of the United States
Clothing companies of the United States
Sportswear brands
Companies based in Philadelphia